Heliopolitans are a fictional group of gods, based on Ancient Egyptian deities, appearing in American comic books published by Marvel Comics.

Publication history
Characters based on ancient Egyptian deities were first mentioned in Captain America Comics #20 (November 1942), published by Marvel Comics' predecessor Timely Comics, in which Captain America and Bucky investigate the murder of Colonel Fitzpatrick, who was studying the Book of Thoth while stationed in Egypt. The Heliopolitans' first full Golden Age appearance was in the story "The Terror That Creeps" by Stan Lee and Werner Roth, published in Marvel Tales #96 (June 1950), and involves a man that fails to convince the public that the Great Sphinx of Giza is slowly moving to the edge of the desert, where it will be empowered by Set and destroy mankind. The goddess Bast would later make her first appearance (as a totem) with the Black Panther in Fantastic Four #52 (July 1966), being called only Panther God, in Black Panther vol. 3 # 21 by Christopher Priest and Sal Velutto, it was revealed that the Panther God is Bast. Many of the other deities, including Horus, Isis and Osiris, were introduced in Thor #239 (September 1975). Khonshu, who became associated with Moon Knight, first appeared in Moon Knight #1 (November 1980). Joseph Muszynski argued in his book Everything I Needed to Know About Life I Learned from Marvel Comics that the introduction of Egyptian deities "excited our tendency to enjoy variety" as the pantheon contained multiple gods and personalities as opposed to the Judeo-Christian religions. Ed Strauss contended that Marvel was able to dive into ancient Egyptian religion because it "had long been retired into the realm of mythology" unlike Christianity.

Fictional history
The Heliopolitans were worshipped as deities by the inhabitants of the Nile River Valley from as early as 10,000 BC. According to Heliopolitan legend, the first of these were Gaea (as Neith), the Demiurge (as Nun), and Set (as Apep/Apophis). Neith and Nun sired Atum, the first of the Ogdoad — the old gods. As Neith went about creating mortal life, Set desired to destroy her creations. In turn, Neith called Atum for protection. Atum and Set fought for eons until Atum transformed into the Demogorge and drove Set off. After Set's defeat, Atum begot the Ennead — the new gods, took the name Ra and settled in the sun.

The Ennead resided in the ancient city of Heliopolis until their king Osiris placed mortal pharaohs in charge so that the gods could become less involved with human affairs and relocated themselves to the extradimensional realm of Celestial Heliopolis, known to the ancient Egyptians as "Aaru." A few, including Bast, Sobek, Sekhmet, Thoth, and Ptah choose to remain on Earth, integrating themselves into The Orisha, the pantheon of Wakanda.
Bast would eventually become the patron deity of Wakanda, while Sobek and Sekhmet became patrons of lesser influential Wakandan cults.

In Celestial Heliopolis, Seth murdered his brother Osiris in an attempted coup but Osiris' wife Isis, and his sons Horus and Anubis combined their powers to resurrect Osiris. Osiris then dispatched Horus to exact revenge on Seth in a battle that lasted for several hundred years, ending when Seth gained the upper hand and sealed the gods in a pyramid. The trapped gods remained in the pyramid for several millennia until they managed to reach out to the Asgardian god Odin. With help from Odin's son, Thor, they defeated Seth, severing his left hand as they battled, and freed the Heliopolitans.

Osiris later empowered Thor to revive Asgardians who were harmed by the Destroyer.

The gods of Heliopolis, powerless and calling themselves "Lost Ones", joined Thor and Earth Force in fighting Seth and his forces again, and ultimately regained their powers after the apparent death of Seth.

Members

 Anubis — The god of the afterlife
 Atum — The god of the sun
 Bast — The god of pleasure, poetry and dance
 Bes — The god of luck and probability 
 Geb — The god of the Earth
 Horus — The god of the Sun
 Isis — The goddess of fertility 
 Khonshu — The god of the Moon
 Neith — The goddess of the Earth
 Nun — The god of the watery abyss
 Nut — The goddess of the sky
 Osiris — The god of the dead
 Ptah — The god of craftsmen and architects
 Sekhmet — The god of war
 Set — The god of chaos and creation 
 Seth — The god of evil and death
 Sobek - The god of rivers
 Thoth — The god of wisdom

In other media

Marvel Cinematic Universe 
The gods Bast and Sekhmet were both mentioned by T'Challa / Black Panther in the 2016 Marvel Cinematic Universe film Captain America: Civil War, with T'Challa explaining, "In my culture, death is not the end. It's more of a stepping-off point. You reach out with both hands, and Bast and Sekhmet, they lead you into the green veld where you can run forever." Bast is again mentioned in the prologue of the 2018 film Black Panther as having helped the first Black Panther become king of Wakanda, and later appears in person in Thor: Love and Thunder portrayed by Akosia Sabet.
Khonshu appears in the live-action Marvel Cinematic Universe (MCU) television series Moon Knight, performed by Karim El-Hakim and voiced by F. Murray Abraham. This version of Khonshu is an outcast amongst his fellow Egyptian gods for waging a "one-god war on perceived injustices", which necessitates him to find and use his avatar, Marc Spector. Additionally, Khonshu was described by the series' head writer Jeremy Slater as an "imperious and sort of snotty and vengeful" deity, who is prone to temper tantrums and is dealing with his own insecurities, adding he was more interested in a version of the character that had "his own moral failings and weaknesses" rather than one who was "always right and impervious to mistakes". Abraham called Khonshu "outrageous" and "capable of doing anything and charming his way out of it". As well, Abraham believed Khonshu was unselfish and willing to sacrifice himself the same way he demands sacrifice from others.

Video games 
Horus appears in Lego Marvel Super Heroes 2, voiced by Colin McFarlane. He is found in the Egypt area of Chronopolis and helps Captain America, Doctor Strange, and Thor fight an awakened N'Kantu, the Living Mummy while Captain Marvel works to free Hulk from the quicksand. After Loki is defeated, Horus sees to it that Loki puts right what he has wronged in Egypt.

References

External links
 
 
 Heliopolis at MarvelDirectory.com
 
 Egyptian Gods at Comic Vine

Characters created by Stan Lee
Fictional ancient people
Marvel Comics deities